Xtra Ottawa (formerly Capital Xtra) was a lesbian, gay, bisexual and transgender community newspaper published in Ottawa, Ontario, Canada. It was launched in 1993. Unlike its biweekly sister publications Xtra in Toronto and Xtra Vancouver in Vancouver, Xtra Ottawa, started as a monthly, and was later published 17 times a year, with a publication schedule of every three weeks. The Ottawa edition had a circulation of 20,000 copies which reached 36,000 readers.

Printed on newsprint in tabloid format from its establishment in 1993, Pink Triangle Press announced on January 14, 2015 that the paper edition would be discontinued and the publication would continue in an exclusively digital media format.

Xtra Ottawa also published a gay tourism map, Out in Ottawa, every spring; the Ultimate Pride Guide in mid-July; and the Index gay business directory in December.

History
Xtra Ottawa was launched by Pink Triangle Press as Capital Xtra in 1993, shortly after the organization learned that Ottawa's existing LGBT publication, GO Info, had largely collapsed and was publishing irregularly with only a skeleton staff. Brandon Matheson, then a freelance journalist working in the Parliament Hill Press Gallery, was chosen to launch the project in conjunction with George Hartsgrove, then an administrator at the University of Ottawa. GO Info briefly tried to beef up its content in the face of its new competition, but folded in early 1994.

In 2007, Ottawa City Council attempted to pass restrictions on the paper's distribution in public facilities after a complaint was filed by Greg Evans. Evans, a father who sat down to read the newspaper while his eight-year-old son was participating in basketball practice at the Hunt Club-Riverside Community Centre, was reportedly offended by the sexually explicit nature of two advertisements in the publication. Evans stated that he was LGBT-friendly and that his complaint was not motivated by homophobia, but by a concern for the possibility of exposing children to sexually explicit material regardless of whether that material was gay or straight in nature.

In March 2010, Capital Xtra was renamed Xtra Ottawa with the launch of a redesign of the Xtra papers in the Toronto, Ottawa and Vancouver markets.

The paper's final print edition was published on February 12, 2015.

Contributors
Early contributors to the magazine included Irshad Manji, Alex Munter, David Pepper, Andrew Griffin and Don McLean. Other contributors have included Glenn Crawford, Suki Lee, Blaine Marchand, Ariel Troster and Bradley Turcotte. Photographic contributors have included Pat Croteau, Eric Faure, Phillip Hannan, Shawn Scallen and Ben Welland.

Community involvement
Xtra Ottawa put on a series of events every year for the Ottawa queer community: the LGX business & consumer expo each spring, the Transgress Festival as part of the Ottawa International Writer's Festival each October, and the Capital Xtra! Community Achievement Awards ceremony to acknowledge local volunteers and activists.

See also
List of newspapers in Canada

References

External links
 Xtra Ottawa

1993 establishments in Ontario
2015 disestablishments in Ontario
LGBT culture in Ottawa
LGBT-related newspapers published in Canada
Publications established in 1993
Publications disestablished in 2015
Newspapers published in Ottawa
Defunct newspapers published in Ontario
Online newspapers with defunct print editions
1990s LGBT literature
2000s LGBT literature
2010s LGBT literature
LGBT literature in Canada